Arnold Winkelried "Jub" Ehrsam (March 18, 1876 – December 27, 1941) was an American college football coach. He served as the second head football coach for the at Kansas State Agricultural College, now Kansas State University. He held the position for one season in 1897, compiling a record of 1–2–1. Although listed as the second coach for the school, he was reportedly the first to be paid for the position.

Ehrsam was a native of Dickinson County, Kansas. His father was the founder of the J. B. Ehrsam & Sons Manufacturing Company, which manufactured and sold machinery for mills, and where Arnold was employed.

Head coaching record

References

External links
 

1876 births
1941 deaths
Kansas State Wildcats football coaches
People from Dickinson County, Kansas